Tanguy Ndombele Alvaro (born 28 December 1996) is a French professional footballer who plays as a midfielder for Serie A club Napoli, on loan from Premier League club Tottenham Hotspur, and the France national team.

Early life

Club career

Early career
As a child, Ndombele played at FC Épinay Athlético, a club based in Épinay-sous-Sénart, about 20 kilometres south-east of Paris, in Essonne. He then moved to Brittany when he was 14, in order to play for Guingamp, where he spent three seasons. He was not offered a professional contract at the end of his development. At 16, he made his senior debut, on 11 January 2014 with the reserves, by replacing Vital N'Simba near the final whistle.

He then signed for SC Amiens, who'd just been relegated from French Ligue 2 in June 2014; he took this as an opportunity to trial at numerous clubs (Auxerre, Caen, and Angers) but wasn't signed. The issue was that Ndombele was criticised for being "overweight"; this was the main reason that he wasn't signed by clubs,  even though trialists were aware that he was a good playmaker.

Ndombele played 2 seasons in Championnat National 3 with the Amiens reserve team. He only played one game during the 2014–15 season, 8 November 2014, once again, coming on late in the match. He became a regular during the 2015–16 season, taking part in 18 matches. He started for the first time on 5 September 2015 at the age of 18 years and 9 months.

Lyon
On 31 August 2017, Ndombele moved to Lyon on a one-year loan. According to L'Équipe, Lyon paid €2 million for the loan. Lyon also secured an option to sign him permanently for €8 million, plus a possible €250,000 in bonuses and 20% of any profit made should he be transferred from Lyon to another club.

Ndombele made his competitive debut for Lyon's first team in the 2–0 Ligue 1 away loss to Paris Saint-Germain on 17 September 2017; he started the match and was replaced by Christopher Martins in the 72nd minute. On 15 February 2018, Ndombele scored a goal (his first career competitive goal for Lyon's first team) in the 46th minute of their 3–1 home win over Villarreal CF in the round of 32 first leg of the 2017–18 UEFA Europa League.

His first season at Lyon was very successful as he provided great energy to the team while helping them get back to Champions League football for the next season as Lyon finished third behind PSG and Monaco. He became an indisputable starter for the team and was, alongside Ferland Mendy and Houssem Aouar, one of the great young players of his team. Few teams also showed interest for the French prodigy but Lyon made it clear that he won't be sold and won't return to his former club Amiens as Lyon paid the €8 million release clause to buy him.

The next season, Lyon signed him permanently as it was previously stated in the loan deal and his contract was extended until 2022 with the Gones. He started off the season well and for his first match in the UEFA Champions League against Manchester City at the Etihad Stadium, he played brilliantly against world-class players while helping his team upset the English giants (2–1 away win, goals from Cornet and Fekir). This 5-star performance helped him gain a lot of attention from big European teams such as Manchester City, Paris Saint-Germain and even Real Madrid. He then scored his first Champions League goal against TSG 1899 Hoffenheim on 11 November 2018 (2–2 draw). As the season progressed, he played consistently and it appeared inevitable that he was going to leave that summer. He scored his first Ligue 1 goal against Nîmes on 24 May 2019 and Lyon eventually finished 3rd in Ligue 1, behind Lille and PSG. His team was also eliminated by FC Barcelona in Champions League Round-of-16 (5–1 loss over the two legs) and finished the season trophyless despite giving out great performances against superior teams (2–1 win against PSG, 2–1 win and 2–2 draw against Manchester City, 0–0 draw against Barcelona). Lyon's president Jean-Michel Aulas announced that he had received offers for Ndombele and that he might leave that summer.

Tottenham Hotspur
On 2 July 2019, Ndombele signed for Tottenham Hotspur in a club-record deal worth €62 million (£55.45 million) plus up to €10 million (£8.97 million) in add-ons, surpassing the previous transfer record set by Davinson Sánchez. He made his debut in the 2019 International Champions Cup against Juventus. Within a minute of being substituted on and with his first touch in a Tottenham shirt, Ndombele assisted Lucas Moura. Tottenham won the game 3–2.

On 10 August 2019, Ndombele made his Premier League debut for Tottenham and scored the first league goal for the club in the 2019–20 season, helping the team to come from behind to win 3–1 against Aston Villa.

Due to his poor form,  after a 1–1 draw with Burnley on 7 March 2020 Tottenham manager José Mourinho criticised Ndombele's performance and his perceived unprofessionalism saying "He's a player with great talent. He has to know he has to do much better and know I cannot keep giving him opportunities to play because the team is much more important."  He only played two further games that season, and his poor relationship with the manager led to widespread expectation he would leave in the summer, but he stayed and the rift eventually healed.

In the 2020–21 season, on 17 September 2020, Ndombele scored the late winner against Lokomotiv Plovdiv in the second qualifying round of the Europa League, sealing a 2–1 win that sent Tottenham to the next qualifying round. In the Premier League game against Manchester United on 4 October, he scored his first Premier League goal of the season, starting a rout that ended in a 6–1 win, which is the biggest win for Tottenham at Old Trafford, and the best result against United since 1932.  His string of strong performances, in particular a 0–0 draw against Chelsea, in which he performed a skill move to get away from N'Golo Kanté and Thiago Silva, led him to be considered by fans to be one of the most polarising midfielders in the Premier League that season.  These strong showings helped his team to stand at the top of the league in December.

On 17 January 2021, Ndombele scored when he flicked the ball while facing away from the goal, and scored from a tight angle with the ball landing at the far corner of Sheffield United's goal, capping a 3–1 win for Tottenham. On 25 January 2021, Ndombele scored his first FA Cup goal in a 4–1 away win over Championship side Wycombe Wanderers in the Fourth Round, eventually scoring a second in stoppage time to secure the victory.  In the final rounds of the season, due to poor fitness condition and injury, Ndombele was left out of the squad by interim manager Ryan Mason.

Return to Lyon
On 31 January 2022, Lyon announced the return of Ndombele on a loan deal until the end of the season, with an option to buy the player for €65 million.

Napoli

On 18 August 2022, Ndombele was loaned to Napoli until the end of the season with an option to buy the player for €30 million.

International career
On 11 October 2018, Ndombele made his senior France debut by coming on as a substitute for Paul Pogba in the 67th minute of the friendly match against Iceland at the Stade du Roudourou in Guingamp that ended in a 2–2 draw.

Personal life
On 27 August 2020, Ndombele tested positive for COVID-19. As a result, he missed out on two matches for the France national team.

Career statistics

Club

International

Honours
Tottenham Hotspur
EFL Cup runner-up: 2020–21

Individual
UNFP Ligue 1 Team of the Year: 2018–19
UEFA Champions League Squad of the Season: 2018–19

References

External links

Profile at the Tottenham Hotspur F.C. website
 
 
 
 

1996 births
Living people
People from Longjumeau
Footballers from Essonne
French footballers
Association football midfielders
ESA Linas-Montlhéry players
En Avant Guingamp players
Amiens SC players
Olympique Lyonnais players
Tottenham Hotspur F.C. players
S.S.C. Napoli players
Ligue 2 players
Ligue 1 players
Premier League players
Serie A players
France under-21 international footballers
France international footballers
French expatriate footballers
Expatriate footballers in England
French expatriate sportspeople in England
Expatriate footballers in Italy
French expatriate sportspeople in Italy
Black French sportspeople
French sportspeople of Democratic Republic of the Congo descent